Complementary Medicine Research (German: Research in Complementary Medicine) is a bimonthly peer-reviewed medical journal covering complementary and alternative medicine. Established in 1994, the journal was known as Forschende Komplementärmedizin und Klassische Naturheilkunde (German: Research in Complementary and Classical Natural Medicine) from 2000 to 2005, and as Forschende Komplementärmedizin from then until 2017. The journal is published by Karger Publishers and the editor-in-chief is Harald Walach (Viadrina European University). According to the Journal Citation Reports, the journal had a 2013 impact factor of 1.053. After the journal obtained its current name in 2017, it lost its impact factor.

It is indexed and abstracted in Index Medicus, MEDLINE/PubMed.

References

External links

Alternative and traditional medicine journals
Karger academic journals
Bimonthly journals
Publications established in 1994
German-language journals
English-language journals
Multilingual journals